Krkovo nad Faro is a small village northeast of Fara in the Municipality of Kostel in southern Slovenia. The area is part of the traditional region of Lower Carniola and is now included in the Southeast Slovenia Statistical Region.

Name
The name of the settlement was changed from Krkovo to Krkovo nad Faro in 1953.

Church
There is a small church in the settlement, dedicated to Saint Leonard and belonging to the Parish of Fara. It was built in the 18th century.

References

External links
Krkovo nad Faro on Geopedia

Populated places in the Municipality of Kostel